Twirl is a chocolate bar manufactured by the British chocolate brand Cadbury. Twirl was invented in Dublin by Cadbury Ireland, and launched there in 1985 as a single-finger bar. It was released in the UK two years later as a twin-finger bar. It has been marketed internationally since the 1990s and is now one of the best-selling chocolate Cadbury products. Twirl consists of two Flake-style fingers covered in milk chocolate.

Variations
Cadbury also produce a snack sized version called Twirl Bites, which come in a bag containing several smaller Twirl-like chocolates.

There is also a multipack version containing 4 twin Twirl bars. This 4-pack weighs 136 grams, meaning each bar weighs exactly 34 grams. Considering each bar consists of two fingers, each finger weighs 17 grams.

In late 2019, Cadbury launched an orange flavoured variety of Twirl in the UK. Many stores struggled to keep stock of the bar, repeatedly selling out due to the high demand. In August 2020, Cadbury announced the return of the Orange Twirl. Consumers could join a pre-sale on Twitter to get access to the first new bars, while stores began to stock them in September. In February 2021, the Orange Twirl became a permanent product.

In June 2022, Cadbury launched a new flavour, Twirl Caramel.

References

External links 
 Cadbury UK

British confectionery
Chocolate bars
Cadbury brands
Mondelez International brands
Products introduced in 1985